A lung counter is a system consisting of a radiation detector, or detectors, and associated electronics that is used to measure radiation emitted from radioactive material that has been inhaled by a person and is sufficiently insoluble as to remain in the lung for weeks, months, or years.

Often, such a system is housed in a low background counting chamber whose thick walls will be made of low-background steel (~20 cm thick) and will be lined with ~1 cm of lead, then perhaps thin layers of cadmium, or tin, with a final layer of copper.  The purpose of the lead, cadmium (or tin), and copper is to reduce the background in the low energy region of a gamma spectrum (typically less than 200 keV)

Calibration 
As a lung counter is primarily measuring radioactive materials that emit low energy gamma rays or x-rays, the phantom used to calibrate the system must be anthropometric. An example of such a phantom is the Lawrence Livermore National Laboratory Torso Phantom.

See also 
 Bomab

Medical equipment
Radiobiology